Horus Heresy is an out-of-print collectible card game originally produced in 2003 by Sabertooth Games. The game is set in the Warhammer 40,000 fictional universe developed by parent company Games Workshop. It attempts to recreate the struggle between the Loyalist forces of the Emperor of Mankind and the Traitor forces of Warmaster Horus, during the civil war known as the Horus Heresy. The game's development and sale by the publisher were discontinued in 2008, following financial difficulties at the parent company.

History
The original game package (Base Set) was released in 2003. The starter pack included several decks, rulesets for the opposing sides, and a variety of accessories and components. Promotional foil cards were also produced, as well as "story cards" that describe the background. Following the game's English language release, versions in other languages were also sold. Booster packs and other companion products were released in the years that followed; the last such set was published in 2005.

The game ruleset and mechanics were designed by Ryan Miller and Luke Peterschmidt. The cards and foils were illustrated by a number of artists from Sabertooth Games' art and design department; background text was provided by Games Workshop writers. The game is set during the Horus Heresy, a galaxy-wide civil war and cornerstone event of the far future fictional universe that is the campaign setting of Games Workshop's Warhammer 40,000 wargame system. The war is set in motion by Horus, previously Warmaster (supreme military commander) of the Imperium of Man and favorite of the Emperor.

The setting for each game set (base or expansion) is limited to a single significant battle or confrontation in the Heresy conflict. However the sets as a collection broadly cover the entire span of the campaign, from its earliest major battle to the final confrontation. The illustrations, annotations, and text provided new information on the Horus Heresy in general; the art joined previous work (in other Horus Heresy products) as the event's initial established imagery. Both art and story text were reproduced in later Games Workshop products.

Following the sale of most Sabertooth Games assets by parent company Games Workshop in 2008, further development or sale of the game and related products was discontinued.

Gameplay overview
A single game of the Horus Heresy Base Set features two commanders and their respective fleets and armies struggling over control of a planet. The attacker and defender fight for control of three  which are deemed key to winning the planet. The game ends if either player captures two sectors, or after four complete turns have elapsed. In the case of neither player capturing two sectors within the allotted play period, whoever has won more sectors (i.e. a single sector while the opponent has none), or the most valuable sector (in the case of each player having won a single sector), wins the game.

At the start of each full turn, players deploy one card face up to each unclaimed sector. Players then draw a hand of six cards and alternate deploying cards face down to an unclaimed sector, one at a time. The goal is to make sure that each sector has the needed assortment of cards to ensure victory over the opponent. One sector can be heavily reinforced, but this will leave another sector vulnerable, so considerable strategy is needed when choosing what to deploy where. Following deployment, the attacking player chooses a sector to contest, and after resolution of that battle, the defending player chooses a different sector to contest (if one remains unclaimed). Each battle ends with one, or neither player winning the sector; after the two battles, the turn ends and a new turn begins (with additional deployments).

Card types
The cards are broken down into four different types:

 Units The majority of cards are of this type, and depict infantry units or vehicles which will do battle on the ground in order to take control of a sector.
 Assets Asset cards represent anything on the battlefield other than troops or units. This includes things such as the presence of an important leader, or the effect of having a command post in the vicinity.
 Ships Ship cards signify a fleet's battleships and transports in orbit high above the planet, which can directly or indirectly assist the battle on the ground.
 Sectors Sectors are the key portions of the planet over which the battles take place. Sector cards have information about the number of troops required to capture the sectors, as well as any special abilities or effects of the area. These cards are never part of the play deck and are only used during game setup.

All cards other than sector cards are either affiliated with one of the two factions, or are unaligned. "Unaligned" cards, representing units or assets usable by either side, feature a set of scales. Loyalist and Traitor cards may not be mixed together in the same play deck, since a deck represents a given side in the conflict.

Card rarity
As with many of the games produced by Sabertooth Games, each playable card has rarity information printed on to help determine how rare it is. The rarity is denoted by the number of small dots appearing at the bottom of the card, according to the following legend:

When the game was first introduced, the starter pack (Base Set) included two play decks, one for the Loyalist and one for the Traitor side. Each contained 3 sector cards, 42 fixed cards, and 18 random cards (including three rares), all of which could theoretically be used. Additional enhancements to the starter were available, 9-card booster packs containing one rare card and eight common-or-uncommon cards. Boosters from later expansion sets contain the same 1-rare/8-common-or-uncommon distribution.

Compatibility
The cards are compatible with the later Dark Millennium collectible card game also published by Sabertooth Games. Loyalist cards from Horus Heresy may be mixed with "Imperial" cards from Dark Millennium, while Traitor cards may be mixed with "Chaos" cards. Unaligned Horus Heresy cards can be used with either of the two, but not with new Dark Millennium types such as the "Ork" and "Eldar" decks. Properly mixed decks are legal Dark Millennium Imperial or Chaos decks, but they are not legal in Horus Heresy.

Cards from the older Warhammer 40,000 Collectible Card Game are semi-compatible with Horus Heresy, requiring rule changes in order to work with the new game system.

Components

Notes

References

External links
 
 "Horus Heresy Collectable Card Game" Unofficial webpage lists cards from several packs, with same-site links to reproductions and to a deck builder

Card games introduced in 2003
Collectible card games
Warhammer 40,000 card games